Mehruiyeh-ye Bala (also Romanized as Mehrū’īyeh-ye Bālā; also known as Mehrūeeyeh-ye Bālā) is a village in Mehruiyeh Rural District, in the Central District of Faryab County, Kerman Province, Iran. At the 2006 census, its population was 315, in 59 families.

References 

Populated places in Faryab County